Vladimir Filippovich Shumeyko (also spelled Shumeiko) (born February 10, 1945) is a Russian political figure.

In November 1991, Vladimir Shumeyko was appointed deputy chairman of the Supreme Soviet of the Russian Federation. In May 1992, Shumeyko, leading a parliamentary delegation, visited Damascus. In June 1992, he became a first deputy prime minister of the Russian government and held that office during the Russian constitutional crisis of 1993. In August 1992, Shumeyko announced that $1 billion of foreign investment was obtained for Russia. Shumeyko held the post of the chairman of the Federation Council of the Federal Assembly of Russia between January 1994 and January 1996.

References

1945 births
Living people
Politicians from Rostov-on-Don
Members of the Federation Council of Russia (1994–1996)
Chairmen of the Federation Council (Russia)
Independent politicians in Russia